Akakpo is a surname. Notable people with the surname include:

Adantor Akakpo (born 1965), Togolese footballer
Comlanvi Akakpo (born 1985), Beninese footballer
Serge Akakpo (born 1987), Togolese footballer
Stella Akakpo (born 1994), French sprinter
Wilson Akakpo (born 1992), Togolese footballer